Deadliest Catch is a documentary television series produced by Original Productions for the Discovery Channel. It portrays the real life events aboard fishing vessels in the Bering Sea during the Alaskan king crab, bairdi crab, and opilio crab fishing seasons.

The Aleutian Islands port of Dutch Harbor, Alaska, is the base of operations for the fishing fleet. The show's title derives from the inherent high risk of injury or death associated with the work.

Deadliest Catch premiered on the Discovery Channel on April 12, 2005, and the show currently airs worldwide. The first season consisted of ten episodes, with the finale airing on June 14, 2005. Subsequent seasons have aired on the same April to June/July schedule every year since the original 2005 season, with more recent seasons airing until August/September.

Series overview

Episodes

Season 1 (2005)

Season 2 (2006)

Season 3 (2007)

Season 4 (2008)
{{Episode table |background=#CC6CFF |overall=5 |season=5 |title=35 |airdate=30 |episodes=

{{#invoke:Episode list|list
 |EpisodeNumber=41
 |EpisodeNumber2=7
 |Title=Seeking the Catch
 |OriginalAirDate=
 |ShortSummary=Heavy seas, lack of proper equipment (no forward-facing sodium lights or crab sorting table), and the crew's inexperience from being away from king crab fishing for three years, made for difficult fishing on board the North American while it tried to catch  of crab to fill their tanks. Under pressure to catch their quota in a limited time, Deck Boss John Skaar's orders to launch pots faster caused conflict on deck when the rest of the crew became concerned that cutting corners was compromising crew safety. Captain Keith Colburn of the Wizard decided to try his luck in an area, called the "Slime Bank" for the multitude of jellyfish, that he had not fished in over 30 years, but the 60 pot string produced no crab and Captain Keith returned to more conventional fishing grounds. A repaired coiler broke again, forcing the crew to hand coil the lines, but they continued to pull up good numbers in the new fishing grounds. The Time Bandit's luck at fishing remote, seldom fished grounds was better when the boat brought up  of crab in 12 hours, led by perfect hook throwing by veteran deckhand Russell Newberry. When an injured cormorant landed on deck, Captain Johnathan Hillstrand took him in until the boat returned to Dutch Harbor where wildlife rescuers could tend to him, but the bird disappeared after the crew finished pulling the string. On board the Cornelia Marie, the crew pulled up full pots, but the stress of fishing and a tight deadline for a changed offload date took its toll on Captain Phil Harris and he became ill, much to the concern of his oldest son, Josh. The Northwestern continued to grind through their pots in heavy seas. When greenhorn Jake Anderson hooked another boat's buoy, Deckhand Matt Bradley saved the day by making a Hail Mary toss of the hook from the stern of the boat.
 |LineColor=CC6CFF
}}

}}

Season 5 (2009)

Season 6 (2010)
{{Episode table |background=#FFFF00 |overall=5 |season=5 |title=35 |airdate=30 |episodes=

{{#invoke:Episode list|list
 |EpisodeNumber=73
 |EpisodeNumber2=7
 |Title=When Hell Freezes Over
 |OriginalAirDate=
 |ShortSummary=Getting set for opilio crab season the Time Bandits crew has some fun with their new greenhorn. The Wizard is a little tougher on theirs. The Cornelia Marie starts the season in dry dock. The rest face ice. 
 |LineColor=FFFF00
}}

}}

Season 7 (2011)

Season 8 (2012)
{{Episode table |background=#F0E68C |overall=5 |season=5 |title=35 |airdate=30 |episodes=

{{#invoke:Episode list|list
 |EpisodeNumber=101
 |EpisodeNumber2=3
 |Title=Weak Links
 |OriginalAirDate=
 |ShortSummary=On the Blue crab grounds, Captain Scott Campbell Jr is still in the midst of a turf war with Elliott Neese of the Ramblin Rose. He is pulling small pots and the crew is being careless at the sorting table. The main culprit is Captain Scott's brother, Chris 'Whip' Welch. As a storm moves into the Blue crab grounds, the Ramblin' Rose pulls the last of its string of pots set on Captain Scott's string. Frustrated with poor fishing, bad weather and the attitude of his crew, Captain Elliott heads out onto the deck to confront his crew about their attitude and the state of disarray on the deck. The Wizard is caught in the same storm as the other two boats on the Blue crab grounds. Wizard greenhorn Danny Maki is struggling to keep up with the other deckhands and when he injures his leg, the hardened crew shows him no mercy. On the Red crab grounds, the Time Bandit has landed on the crab and Captain Johnathan Hillstrand has decided it is the right time to spread deckhand Justin Tennisons' ashes. The crew gathers on deck to pay their respects and spread his ashes into the Bering Sea along with a Jolly Roger flag. Gunfire and shouts ring out as they bid him a last farewell. On board the Kodiak, Captain "Wild" Bill Wichrowski is frustrated with the empty pots and his new crew member, Jason Rainwater. He's having a hard time fitting in and doesn't take direction well. Captain Bill notices that Rainwater isn't measuring the crab and reminds him that the crew pays the fine for having small crab in the tanks and the other crew members turn on him as well. Rainwater is put on the rail, hauling pots that start coming up full changing the climate on deck and in the wheelhouse. Captain Scott is still struggling with poor numbers and poor attitude on deck. Chris 'Whip' Welch gets his arm caught under the block and spends 12 hours with ice on it. After a pep talk from Captain Scott, Whip returns to the deck. The Ramblin' Rose is re-setting gear with an exhausted crew in very poor weather. Their negative comments are heard in the wheelhouse, further frustrating Captain Elliott. Deckboss Kevin 'Kado' Davis heads to the wheelhouse to try to defuse the situation and Captain Elliott feels pressured to give the crew three hours of sleep.
|LineColor=F0E68C
}}

}}

Season 9 (2013)

Season 10 (2014)
{{Episode table |background=#665638 |overall=5 |season=5 |title=35 |airdate=30 |episodes=

{{#invoke:Episode list|list
 |EpisodeNumber=132
 |EpisodeNumber2=2
 |Title=Family Affair
 |OriginalAirDate=
 |ShortSummary=The episode opens with a voice-over by Cape Caution Captain "Wild" Bill Wichrowski and footage across the fleet from the episode: "It's the old question: 'What does it take to make it on the Bering Sea?' On paper, a guy can look great: ex-Marine, commercial fisherman, sport fisherman" (referring to his latest greenhorn's qualifications). The introduction concludes by switching to Bill in his Captain's chair saying "You gotta be nuts to do this job."

The fleet is way behind schedule thanks to the government shutdown, as noted by the comments of the Captains, and a storm bearing down on the fleet makes that problem worse.

Cape Cautions lone greenhorn is still not 100%, but is needed to help with gear, and carelessly tosses a pot buoy into a crew member.

Seabrooke is pounded by waves as Junior wrestles with severe back pain, but the set-back string has great numbers, and sets back a third time.

55-knot winds haven't done much to stop the Saga, with 30,000 lbs in the tanks and a 38 crab-per-pot average, and the set-back string continues Captain Elliott's first red king season success until the numbers of keepers drops to singles.

On the Northwestern, they have 100,000 lbs on board and look to top off the tanks. Before they haul the pots, Edgar must fix a sudden electrical problem with the mast-mounted lights. Edgar remounts two of the lights on the deck in the interim. As they haul pots, Captain Sig hears communications between a USCG rescue helicopter and the Blue Gadus: "I'm not sure who that is; I think that's a long-liner." 148 miles southwest, a Blue Gadus crewman has suffered a pulmonary embolism and requires medevac. which will be extremely difficult in the storm due to 30-foot seas and 100-knot winds. It takes two attempts to land the rescue basket on deck, but they complete the rescue. Sig comments how lucky the rescued guy is, that the copter rescued him before the worst of the storm caused them to abort the rescue.

On the Seabrooke, Junior is looking to top off the tanks and go home. The third time through the string has very low numbers, and the weather radio broadcast forecasts 40-knot winds with 14-18-foot seas. Switching to later that night on the Time Bandit, the forecast is for east 50-knot winds and 24-foot seas with fog and rain.

On the Wizard, Captain Keith knows he's in for "three-four days of bad weather, some of that hellaciously bad", as he's already experiencing sustained 65-mph winds gusting to 80 and 90. As the brunt of the storm hits, the Captains are left to decide how much pain to endure before calling crews off the rails.

On the Time Bandit, Captain Johnathan gives his son/deck boss Scott a pep talk before hauling pots. After a 29-hour soak, their pots come up with great numbers, but 25-foot swells are causing Axel (son of engineer Neal and nephew of Captains Johnathan and Andy) to have problems controlling the 800-lb pots. Scott and Axel have a cousin shouting match after a wave knocks Axel off balance and almost crushes him against the sorting table. Johnathan shuts down fishing before anyone gets hurt.

Weather radio forecasts east 45 to southwest 50-knot winds, and Sig, Junior and Elliott also decide to shut down fishing until the worst passes. Only the Cape Caution is still fishing, and the new location of low numbers is not good, however the greenhorn is finally in the groove and the crew is working together as bigger numbers (and a big crab) arrive.
 |LineColor=665638
}}

{{#invoke:Episode list|list
 |EpisodeNumber=135
 |EpisodeNumber2=5
 |Title=On the Rocks
 |OriginalAirDate=
 |ShortSummary= As crews prepare to head to the Bairdi grounds, a mayday call from Arctic Hunter just outside Dutch Harbor prompts a dramatic at-sea rescue from the least likely heroes: Elliott and Mike Neese and the crew of the Saga. While the Saga comes as close as they dare, the crew gets a scare when the underside of the hull smacks the bottom when it goes down with the waves, and back off a bit. With the Arctic Hunters crew in their life raft, Mike and another deckhand swim out to the life raft and on the second try, successfully get a rope secured to it. The Saga tows them out of danger and gets the stranded crew aboard.

On the Cape Caution, Bill's greenhorn Kelly is looking for a way off the boat by revealing that he has a pending arrest warrant hanging over him (for constructing an illegal firearm), and must return to shore for trial. Bill is not convinced by his story, and decides to call Kelly's bluff by contacting the authorities himself - who tell him that Kelly can finish his contractual obligations first. When offloading in Dutch, Bill delivers the bad news to Kelly, that he must return to sea to finish the season. On the Seabrooke, Junior's back is troubling him and his crew convince him to head for shore. As boats complete their fishing, they see how badly the Arctic Hunter has been damaged by rocks and waves just days after running aground.
 |LineColor=665638
}}

{{#invoke:Episode list|list
 |EpisodeNumber=142
 |EpisodeNumber2=12
 |Title=Women Drivers
 |OriginalAirDate=
 |ShortSummary= The crew of the Cornelia Marie follow an old tradition by getting Mohawk haircuts for good luck. And soon after, things get better. The boom that was accidentally broken by Fisher receives expensive repairs on the Saga.
Elliott brings his new girlfriend on board. His crew expresses their opinions about that. His girlfriend has to call a doctor on board to treat Elliott, who diagnoses him with a kidney infection.
The Cape Caution'''s Captain Bill is not happy with his son Zach's lack of enthusiasm. He threatens to punch him, and tells him their conversation was captain to crewman, not father to son.
On the Northwestern'', Sig's daughter Mandy has to be awakened to get to work. The other crew members offer commentary about that. She begins to experience life as a greenhorn. Sig's fatherly protectiveness kicks in. And he goes on deck to show her how it's done. Soon, an arctic squall impedes operations. Sig even lets Mandy haul pots during the inclement weather, arousing resentment from the crew.
 |LineColor=665638
}}
{{#invoke:Episode list|list
 |EpisodeNumber=143
 |EpisodeNumber2=13
 |Title=Greatest Game Ever Fished
 |OriginalAirDate=
 |ShortSummary= The Seattle Seahawks are playing in the final of the Super Bowl, and the crews are keen to finish their first trips of the season and get back to Dutch to watch the game. The Time Bandit is pulling big numbers, but things come to an abrupt end when the vessel throws a propeller, forcing a return to port for repairs. The Wizard is too far north to get back in time, but Captain Keith pipes the radio commentary onto the deck whilst his crew work on. Despite poor fishing, Casey and Josh decide to take the Cornelia Marie back to port in treacherous waters to make the game - Josh says he will "swim if he has to". Celebrations are all over St Paul when the Seahawks win, but Captain Andy and Scott Hillstrand have a massive fall-out when Scott suggests his uncle should abandon the rest of the Opilio season and give the ''Time Bandits quota to him for use on another boat. 
 |LineColor=665638
}}

}}

Season 11 (2015)

Season 12 (2016)

Season 13 (2017)

Season 14 (2018)

Season 15 (2019)

Season 16 (2020)

Season 17 (2021)
In March 2021, Discovery announced that the show will be streaming new episodes on their streaming platform Discovery+. The first episode aired on the streaming service on March 19, 2021, one month before the episode was scheduled to air on Discovery Channel. Discovery+ released new episodes to its subscribers one week before the episodes aired on Discovery Channel.

Season 18 (2022)
In Season 18, in the wake of the cancellation of the red king crab season, several boats turned to other fisheries for survival, including golden king crab, dungeness crab, and black cod.

Specials
{{Episode table |background=#000000 |season=5 |seasonT=Featuredseason |title=40 |airdate=20 |episodes=

{{#invoke:Episode list|list
 |EpisodeNumber2  = 10
 |Title           = Behind the Lens
 |OriginalAirDate = 
 |ShortSummary    = Go behind the scenes of Season 9 as 40 cameramen prepare to cover 6 crab boats for 160 days, including series firsts in underwater and aerial photography. Camera crews get their safety briefings from the Captains (plus an important one from Monte about not angering his brother) and work to prepare 100 cameras on the 6 featured vessels and the 2 chase boats. Cameramen capture the fleet's king season departure from two unique perspectives: the bottom of Dutch Harbor, and aerial shots from a belly-mounted turret camera worthy of the James Bond movie Skyfall. Insights into creating music from the Bering Sea as series Creator/Executive Producer Thom Beers and series Produucer R. Decker Watson Jr. get into the act creating sounds for composer Didier Rachou to weave into the soundtracks. Veteran cameraman Todd Stanley is upset about Captain Elliott's cavalier attitude regarding ice buildup on the Saga and asks chase boat Amatuli to keep a close watch on them. Supervising Editor Josh Earl, A.C.E. comes up from Burbank, California, to the Wizards deck, and successfully passes the survival suit drill in 50.8 seconds. Updates of cameraman Matt Fahey's battle with cancer.
 |LineColor       = 665638
}}

}}

Mini-series and extended episodes
After the CatchAfter the Catch is a mini-series that aired following or during the main Deadliest Catch seasons from 2007 to 2012. It primarily consists of roundtable discussions between the captains about their experiences as featured on the show, and after the season ended. After the Catch III-VI also include vignettes of the captains taking part in various activities where taping happened (like in the San Diego area during After the Catch III). After the Catch uses the same opening credits as Deadliest Catch except for the title and theme music.Deadliest Catch narrator Mike Rowe hosted all episodes except After the Catch III, when Cash Cabs Ben Bailey hosted. After the Catch IV-VI began airing before the current season of Deadliest Catch was over, usually around the start of Opilio season.

After the Catch I (2007)
Filmed at the "Lockspot" bar in Seattle, Washington.

Theme music by Andy Kubiszewski.

After the Catch II (2008)
Filmed at "Pratty's" pub in Gloucester, Massachusetts.

Theme music by Andy Kubiszewski.

After the Catch III (2009)Cash Cabs Ben Bailey hosts this season. Filmed at "RT's Longboard Grill" and other locations in and near San Diego, California.

Theme music by Andy Kubiszewski.

After the Catch IV (2010)
Mike Rowe returns as host; filmed at the "Blue Nile" bar and other locations in and near New Orleans, Louisiana.

Theme music: "Hard Row To Hoe", written and performed by Dege Legg.

After the Catch V (2011)
Hosted by Mike Rowe, and filmed at "The Shack" restaurant in Hawaii Kai and other locations on Oahu.

Theme music: "Hard Row To Hoe", written and performed by Dege Legg.

After the Catch VI (2012)
Hosted by Mike Rowe, and filmed at the "Whale's Tail" bar and other locations in and near Breckenridge, Colorado.

Theme music: "Hard Row To Hoe", written and performed by Dege Legg.

Inside the Catch (2012)

The BaitThe Bait was a "pregame show" roundtable documentary-style television mini-series that previews select episodes of Deadliest Catch for seasons 9 and 10, filmed in Dutch Harbor, and hosted by Sig Hansen, Johnathan and Andy Hillstrand, and Keith Colburn, with narration by Deadliest Catch narrator Mike Rowe.

The captains swapped stories about the off-season and hinted on what the viewers could expect in that night's episode, with previews of the upcoming season in the king crab and opilio crab kickoffs.

Regular features included "The Hot Seat" (interview focused on one Captain or deckhand) and questions from celebrity fans of the show.

The spin-off series was produced in partnership with Original Productions and Silent Crow Arts.

Theme music was a six-second instrumental clip at the end of "Hard Row To Hoe" by Dege Legg (from After the Catch VI'').

It was replaced by On Deck after season 10.

The Bait I (2013)
Episodes 4-7 were filmed at Mercer Island VFW near Seattle.

{{Episode table |background=#330055 |overall=10 |title=35 |airdate=25 |episodes=
{{#invoke:Episode list|list
 |EpisodeNumber   = 1
 |Title           = Opening Day: King Crab
 |OriginalAirDate = 
 |ShortSummary    = Sig, Johnathan, Andy and Keith offer a preview of Season 9. Discussion topics: "Old vs. Young" (old guys staying in the game vs. new guys like Elliott and Junior); "Sibling Rivalries" among the Hansen, Hillstrand and Colburn brothers about sharing the helm (with guest Captain/deck boss Edgar); "Where We Left Off" (recapping Season 8's slashed quotas and early descending ice pack); "The Off Season" (what the Captains did for fun or work between seasons, including the Time Bandit engine and hull upgrades); "Wild Bill" the weatherman for The Bait, and also fired by the Kodiak'''s owners after Season 8 for losing crab pots due to the early descending ice pack; "The Josh Harris Situation": Johnathan and Andy interview Josh about the situation with him, his brother Jake, and three years of frustration trying to purchase the Cornelia Marie (with flashbacks from After the Catch IV and After the Catch VI).

Regular feature "The Hot Seat" debuts with Sig interviewing Elliott the dad; Keith interviewing Elliott the Captain (with guest appearance by Executive Producer Jeff Conroy showing time-coded tape of events that led to Elliott being fired from the Ramblin' Rose) and previewing Elliott's new purchase, the Saga (last seen in Season 1); and Andy interviewing Junior about his "legend-ary" Season 8 and previews of Season 9 troubles he'll have with Keith.

"Boat Tour": Johnathan is pranked by Keith and Monte after touring the Wizard; Wild Bill shows Edgar his new ride, the Cape Caution, which required a lot of repairs by the owners to put it in service again on short notice. Celebrity questions from actor Steve Carell.
 |LineColor       = 330055
}}

{{#invoke:Episode list|list
 |EpisodeNumber   = 4
 |Title           = Fouled By Weather
 |OriginalAirDate = 
 |ShortSummary    = Opening with scenes depicting Opilio fishing described in Mike Rowe's introduction as "fouled by weather", the Captains and crews are having some anger management issues over another very bad Opilio weather season, especially Zack and crew on the Cape Caution, a deckhand fight on the Wizard and Captain Andy and the Time Bandit crew of veteran deckhands.

First up in "The Hot Seat", the Time Bandit crew, represented first by Josh Harris then by deck boss Mike Fourtner discussing the lack of bait (Axel's job) and Andy missing a double-rogue wave call that endangered the crew and sent a pot overboard. What likely saved the crew was their "sea wall", a high section of railing that crew can duck behind, as Junior demonstrates on Seabrooke where his rails were before the season, and where they are now after installing the sea walls.

Wild Bill delivers a typical rainy Seattle weather report, with Edgar providing the garden hose rainfall. Back in studio, the Captains and Wild Bill discuss lousy fishing, Mikey having a new girlfriend back in Oregon, and Zack berating the old man for the bad numbers. During a break in taping, Johnathan and Andy try to poach Zack from Wild Bill until Bill sees what's going on.

Celebrity questions from Red Hot Chili Peppers drummer Chad Smith. Their musical and community appreciation is shown with footage from "The Captains' Concert" at the SXSW festival in Austin, Texas. When asked by a local reporter what kind of music they listen to on deck, Sig and Johnathan tell him no music, because they need to be able to communicate, which leads into a discussion back in studio about "Distractions at Sea", led by Elliott's boom box drowning out a rogue wave much like the one Andy missed.

Next up in "The Hot Seat": Elliott, discussing his personal problems and their effect on the Saga crew. Junior provides an update on his father being past the critical stage and recovering, and facing a two-week delay in the start of his Opilio season heading into a descending ice pack driving the rest of the fleet south as he heads north.

Next in "The Hot Seat": Jake Anderson makes his debut on The Bait, facing Sig and Edgar again, and also discussing the Seattle/Oregon rivalry when the Kiska Sea crew resents a Seattle kid potentially running the boat. "Sunshine", Jake's replacement on Northwestern also appears.

Special guest C. J. Cutter from Blood and Oil visits the set and previews an episode of that Discovery series. Lenny and the Captains discuss Freddy's fight with the Wizards greenhorn.
 |LineColor       = 330055
}}

}}

On Deck
In the ninth season in 2013, Discovery continued the trend of expanded show notes and unaired scenes in its series with Deadliest Catch: On Deck. On Deck episode titles are the same as the Deadliest Catch episode they expand on.

Discovery made these episodes the primary lead-in program for the night's episode starting with season 11, replacing The Bait.

On Deck I (2013)

On Deck II (2014)

Decked (2014)Decked is a rebroadcast episode of Deadliest Catch'' featuring webcam CatchChat with one or more Captains between episode segments.

Captain's Choice (2015)

See also
List of awards and nominations received by Deadliest Catch

References

Unaired episode names and projected air dates based on: Discovery.com Deadliest Catch Episodes.

Lists of American non-fiction television series episodes
Lists of American reality television series episodes